The Greek destroyer Psara (D-98) was a Greek destroyer of the , which served with the Hellenic Navy during the early stages of the Second World War. It was named after the Aegean island of Psara, which played an important role in the Greek War of Independence, and was the fourth ship to bear this name.

She was constructed in Sestri Ponente, Italy, by Cantieri Odero, and commissioned by the Hellenic Navy in 1933. After the outbreak of the Greco-Italian War, she participated in all three naval raids against Italian shipping in the Strait of Otranto (14–15 November 1940, 15–16 December 1940, and 4–5 January 1941), and had significant anti-submarine activity. During the German invasion of Greece, she was attacked by German bomber aircraft on April 20, 1941, and sunk in the Saronic Gulf near Megara, with 37 members of her crew as casualties.

References

Kountouriotis-class destroyers
Ships built in Italy
1932 ships
World War II destroyers of Greece
World War II shipwrecks in the Aegean Sea
Maritime incidents in April 1941
Destroyers sunk by aircraft
Ships sunk by German aircraft
Shipwrecks of Greece